José Rosas Aispuro Torres  (born 19 October 1961) is a Mexican lawyer and politician affiliated with the National Action Party who served as the governor of Durango from 2016 to 2022. From 2012 to 2015, he served as senator in the LXII and LXIII Legislatures representing Durango. He also was Municipal President of Durango, Durango from 2001 to 2004.

He was member of the Chamber of Deputies in the LVI and LX Legislatures, when he was affiliated with the PRI.

Life
Aispuro Torres was born on 19 October 1961, in Tamazula, Durango. He became a member of the Institutional Revolutionary Party (PRI) in 1980 and began pursuing his bachelor's degree in law from the Universidad Autónoma de Sinaloa in 1981. After also obtaining his doctorate in law, he served in the Durango state government and the PRI before his first tour as a federal legislator. He was a deputy in the LVI Legislature, where he sat on the Human Rights, Youth Matters, and Legislative Investigations commissions. In 1995, Aispuro became the president of the PRI in Durango.

From 1998 to 2001, Aispuro was a local deputy in the LXI Legislature of the Congress of Durango. In 1999, he also became a professor of law, chairing the graduate studies division of the law school at the Universidad Juárez del Estado de Durango.

For Aispuro, much of the early 2000s was spent in municipal affairs. He was the municipal president of Victoria de Durango between 2001 and 2004; twice in that period, he was the president of the National Conference of Municipalities of Mexico, and he also presided over the National Federation of Municipalities for a year. During this time, he was considered for a PRI candidacy to the governorship of Durango and wrote two books: Digesto Constitucional Mexicano: las constituciones de Durango (2001), on the evolution of Durango's state constitutions, and El municipio en Iberoamérica (2003), on municipal matters. From 2005 to 2006, Aispuro served as the director general of the Durango state pension system.

While he was originally considered to run for Senate from the PRI, in 2006 Aispuro became a federal deputy in the LX Legislature. In his second tour in San Lázaro, he was the secretary of the Commission for the Strengthening of Federalism and served on the Finance and Public Credit and Education Commissions, as well as a committee devoted to gender equality.

In 2010, Aispuro left the PRI and was immediately put forth as a gubernatorial candidate by a coalition of the PAN, PRD, PT and Convergencia. He lost by 11,000 votes to the PRI candidate, Jorge Herrera Caldera.

Two years later, the PAN ran Aispuro for the Senate, and he served for three years, opting to resign on 15 December 2015, in order to run for governor of Durango. He was replaced by Héctor David Flores Ávalos. On 4 February 2016, a PAN-PRD alliance nominated Aispuro for governor, and he won the elections on 5 June 2016; rapid counts showed him winning with 46 percent of the vote.

When Aispuro took office on 1 September 2016, he became the first governor of Durango to come from a party other than the PRI.

References

1961 births
Living people
Politicians from Durango
20th-century Mexican lawyers
National Action Party (Mexico) politicians
Institutional Revolutionary Party politicians
Members of the Senate of the Republic (Mexico)
Members of the Chamber of Deputies (Mexico)
Governors of Durango
Autonomous University of Sinaloa alumni
National Autonomous University of Mexico alumni
Members of the Congress of Durango
20th-century Mexican politicians
21st-century Mexican politicians
Deputies of the LX Legislature of Mexico
21st-century Mexican lawyers